The Green line is a light metro line of the Taoyuan Metro that is under construction. The green line will join with the Taoyuan Airport MRT at Kengkou and Hengshan. 

Construction on the Green line began in Bade District, Taoyuan on 15 October 2018. A groundbreaking ceremony was held on 11 October 2019 and the line is projected to open in 2026.

History

Station list

References

External links
Department of Rapid Transit Systems,Taoyuan, Taoyuan > Home > Service Information > Metro Green Line

Proposed public transportation in Taiwan
Taoyuan Airport MRT